The Taipei Economic and Cultural Office in the Philippines represents the interests of Taiwan in the Philippines, functioning as a de facto embassy in the absence of diplomatic relations. Its Philippine counterpart is the "Manila Economic and Cultural Office" in Taipei.   

It was first established in 1975 as the Pacific Economic and Cultural Center, replacing the former Republic of China Embassy. In 1984, its staff acquired diplomatic privileges and immunity, as did those of its Philippine  counterpart, then known as the Asian Exchange Center. It adopted its present name in December 1989.

Representatives
 Gary Lin (23 September 2014-)
 Wu Hsin-hsing (2003-2008)

See also
 Taipei Economic and Cultural Representative Office
 Manila Economic and Cultural Office
 Philippines–Taiwan relations

References

 

1975 establishments in the Philippines
Chinese Taipei
Organizations established in 1975
Philippines
Philippines–Taiwan relations